This list of ancient Greek temples  covers temples built by the Hellenic people from the 6th century BC until the 2nd century AD on mainland Greece and in Hellenic towns in the Aegean Islands, Asia Minor, Sicily and Italy ("Magna Graecia"), wherever there were Greek colonies, and the establishment of Greek culture. Ancient Greek architecture was of very regular form, the construction being post and lintel.

There are three clearly defined styles: the Doric order, found throughout Greece, Sicily and Italy; the Ionic order, from Asia Minor, with examples in Greece; and the more ornate Corinthian order, used initially only for interiors, becoming more widely used during the Hellenistic period from the 1st century BC onwards and used extensively by Roman architects.

Each ancient Greek temple was dedicated to a specific god within the pantheon and was used in part as a storehouse for votive offerings. Unlike a church, the interior space was not used as a meeting place, but held trophies and a large cult statue of the deity.

Overview

Most ancient Greek temples were rectangular and were approximately twice as long as they were wide, with some notable exceptions such as the enormous Temple of Olympian Zeus, Athens with a length of nearly 2 1/2 times its width. A number of surviving temple-like structures are circular, and are referred to as tholos (Ancient Greek: "dome").

The largest temples, mainly Ionic and Corinthian, but including the Doric Temple of Olympian Zeus, Agrigento, were between 90 and 120 metres (approx. 300–390 feet) in length.

Terminology

The temple rises from a stepped base (stylobate) which elevates the structure above the ground on which it stands. Early examples, such as the Temple of Zeus, Olympia, have two steps but the majority, like the Parthenon, have three, with the exceptional example of the Temple of Apollo, Didyma, having six. The core of the building is a masonry-built naos within which is a cella, a windowless room originally housing the statue of the god. The cella generally has a porch (pronaos) before it, and perhaps a second chamber (antenaos) serving as a treasury or repository for trophies and gifts. The chambers were lit by a single large doorway, fitted with a wrought iron grill. Some rooms appear to have been illuminated by skylights.

On the stylobate, often completely surrounding the naos, stand rows of columns. Each temple is defined as being of a particular type, with two terms: one describing the number of columns across the entrance front using Greek numeral prefixes, and the other describing their distribution.

Distyle in antis describes a small temple with two columns at the front, which are set between the projecting walls of the pronaos or porch, like the Temple of Nemesis at Rhamnus.(see figure 1.)
Amphiprostyle tetrastyle describes a small temple that has columns at both ends which stand clear of the naos. Tetrastyle indicates that there are four columns, like those of the Temple on the Ilissus in Athens.(Figure 4.)
Peripteral hexastyle describes a temple with a single row of peripheral columns around the naos, with six (hexa) columns across the front, like the Theseion in Athens. (Figure 7.) 
Peripteral octastyle describes a temple with a single row of columns around the naos, (Figure 7.) with eight columns across the front, like the Parthenon, Athens.(Figs. 6 and 9.)
Dipteral decastyle describes the huge temple of Apollo at Didyma, with the naos surrounded by a double row of columns, (Figure 6.) with ten columns across the entrance front.
 The Temple of the Olympian Zeus, Agrigento, is termed pseudo-periteral heptastyle, because its encircling colonnade has "pseudo" columns that are attached to the walls of the naos. (Figure 8.) Heptastyle means that it has seven columns across the entrance front.

Exact measurements are not available for all buildings. Some have foundations that are intact and have been well surveyed, for others the size can only be estimated from scant remains. There may also be differences between publications where measurements have been in feet or metres or converted between the two.

List

Sorting behaviour (by column):
 Towns' alphabetical order
 Towns by region - Greece, Turkey, Italy 
 By the deity's name
 By date
 By area size
 By temple style (1-Doric, 2-Doric with Ionic or Corinthian elements, 3-Ionic, 4-Corinthian)

See also
 Ancient Greek architecture
 Ancient Greek religion
 Art in Ancient Greece
 Greek culture
 Greek technology
 List of ancient architectural records
 List of Greco-Roman roofs

Notes

References

Bibliography
Banister Fletcher, A History of Architecture on the Comparative method, Seventeenth edition, revised by R.A. Cordingley, Athlone Press, (1963) Chapter III, Greek Architecture, pp. 89 – 165.
 
 
 Trewin Copplestone (editor), Lloyd, Rice, Lynton, Boyd, Carden, Rawson, Jacobus,  World Architecture: an Illustrated History, Paul Hamlyn, (1968); Seton Lloyd, Chapter 1: Ancient & Classical Architecture
 William Bell Dinsmoor, William James Anderson, The Architecture of Ancient Greece: an account of its historic development, Biblo and Tannen, (1973) 
 Banister Fletcher, A History of Architecture on the Comparative method (2001). Elsevier Science & Technology. .
 Helen Gardner; Fred S. Kleiner, Christin J. Mamiya, Gardner's Art through the Ages. Thomson Wadsworth, (2004) .
 Marian Moffett, Michael Fazio, Lawrence Wodehouse, A World History of Architecture, Lawrence King Publishing, (2003), .
 Donald E. Strong, The Classical World, Paul Hamlyn, London (1965) 
 Henri Stierlin, Greece: From Mycenae to the Parthenon, Taschen, (2004), 

Architectural history lists
Temples
 List of Ancient Greek temples